Cormac Laidir MacCarthy, 9th Lord of Muskerry (1411–1494), was an Irish chieftain. He founded Kilcrea Friary and built Kilcrea Castle.

Birth and origins 
Cormac was born in 1411, the eldest son of Teige MacCarthy. His father was the 6th Lord of Muskerry. His father's family were the MacCarthys of Muskerry, a Gaelic Irish dynasty that had branched from the MacCarthy-Mor line in the 14th century when a younger son received Muskerry as appanage. Nothing seems to be known about his mother, not even her name.

He had a younger brother Dermod, ancestor of the MacCarthys of Drishane, and a sister Ellen, married first Donal MacCarthy Reagh, Prince of Carbery, and then secondly Eoghan of Rathduane.

Marriage and children 
Muskerry married Mary, daughter of Edmond FitzThomas Fitzmaurice, 9th Baron Kerry (died 1498), who is also called Baron Lixnaw instead of Baron Kerry.

 
Cormac and Mary had at least one son:
 Cormac Oge (died 1536), his successor,

—and two daughters (birth order unknown):
 Sheila or Julia, married Thomas FitzGerald, 11th Earl of Desmond as his 1st wife

 Ellen, married Donal MacCarthy Reagh, 12th Prince of Carbery

Later life 
His father died in 1448 but MacCarthy did not succeed immediately. Two uncles, Owen the 7th Lord and Cormac the 8th Lord, reigned based on tanistry. 

MacCarthy improved Blarney Castle by enlarging its keep. A Latin inscription on the machicolation of the added part reads "Cormac Macarthy fortis me fieri facit AD 1446", which translates into "Cormac MacCarthy the stout had me built anno domini 1446". He might also have built Carrignamuck Tower House unless that was his son. According to the legend Maccarthy discovered and enshrined the Blarney Stone.

In 1465 he founded and built Kilcrea Friary and built nearby Kilcrea Castle.

Death 
Muskerry died in 1494 having been killed by his brother Owen and was buried in the chancel of the church of the Kilcrea Friary. No epitaph is found there now, but earlier observers have recorded the following Latin inscription:
Hic Jacet Cormacus fil. Thadei, fil. Cormaci, fil. Dermatu magni Mc Carthy Dnus de Musgraigh Flayn ac istius conventus primus fondator, an Dom. 1494
which translates as: Here lies Cormac, son of Thadeus, son of Cormac, son of Dermot the elder, Prince of Muskerry, the initial founder of this friary, anno domini 1494. Interestingly the Latin text uses the Irish word "Flayn", "Prince", in addition to Dominus as his title.

Notes and references

Notes

Citations

Sources 

 
  – to 1603
 
 
  – Earls (for Earl of Kerry)
 
  – "The bald", earl of Desmond
  – 1373 to 1500
  – Irish stem
 
 
 

1411 births
1494 deaths
MacCarthy dynasty